Qualitative analysis may refer to:

 Qualitative research, an inquiry into the reasoning behind human behavior
 Qualitative inorganic analysis, a type of chemical analysis

In terms of organic compound:- It used to analyse the sample of drug or chemical  as mentioned on the label on the container including its molecular formula, state, stability etc.